Benito Juárez  is one of the 81 municipalities of Guerrero, in south-western Mexico. The municipal seat lies at San Jerónimo de Juárez. The municipality covers an area of 284.9 km². It is drained by the Río Atoyac.

As of 2005, the municipality had a total population of 14,444.

It was named in honour of 19th-century president and patriot Benito Juárez.

References

External links 
 San Jerónimo de Juárez

Municipalities of Guerrero